Leptonetela is a genus of  leptonetids that was first described by J. Kratochvíl in 1978.

Species
 it contains 118 species:
L. andreevi Deltshev, 1985 – Greece
L. anshun Lin & Li, 2010 – China
L. arvanitidisi Wang & Li, 2016 – Greece
L. bama Lin & Li, 2010 – China
L. biocellata He, Liu, Xu, Yin & Peng, 2019 – China
L. caucasica Dunin, 1990 – Caucasus (Russia, Georgia, Azerbaijan), Iran?
L. chakou Wang & Li, 2017 – China
L. changtu Wang & Li, 2017 – China
L. chenjia Wang & Li, 2017 – China
L. chiosensis Wang & Li, 2011 – Greece
L. chuan Wang & Li, 2017 – China
L. curvispinosa Lin & Li, 2010 – China
L. dabian Wang & Li, 2017 – China
L. danxia Lin & Li, 2010 – China
L. dao Wang & Li, 2017 – China
L. dashui Wang & Li, 2017 – China
L. deltshevi (Brignoli, 1979) – Turkey
L. digitata Lin & Li, 2010 – China
L. encun Wang & Li, 2017 – China
L. erlong Wang & Li, 2017 – China
L. falcata (Chen, Gao & Zhu, 2000) – China
L. feilong Wang & Li, 2017 – China
L. flabellaris Wang & Li, 2011 – China
L. furcaspina Lin & Li, 2010 – China
L. gang Wang & Li, 2017 – China
L. geminispina Lin & Li, 2010 – China
L. gigachela (Lin & Li, 2010) – China
L. gittenbergeri Wang & Li, 2011 – Greece
L. grandispina Lin & Li, 2010 – China
L. gubin Wang & Li, 2017 – China
L. hamata Lin & Li, 2010 – China
L. hangzhouensis (Chen, Shen & Gao, 1984) – China
L. hexacantha Lin & Li, 2010 – China
L. huoyan Wang & Li, 2017 – China
L. identica (Chen, Jia & Wang, 2010) – China
L. jiahe Wang & Li, 2017 – China
L. jinsha Lin & Li, 2010 – China
L. jiulong Lin & Li, 2010 – China
L. kanellisi (Deeleman-Reinhold, 1971) (type) – Greece
L. kangsa Wang & Li, 2017 – China
L. la Wang & Li, 2017 – China
L. langdong Wang & Li, 2017 – China
L. latapicalis He, Liu, Xu, Yin & Peng, 2019 – China
L. liangfeng Wang & Li, 2017 – China
L. lianhua Wang & Li, 2017 – China
L. lihu Wang & Li, 2017 – China
L. lineata Wang & Li, 2011 – China
L. liping Lin & Li, 2010 – China
L. liuguan Wang & Li, 2017 – China
L. liuzhai Wang & Li, 2017 – China
L. longli Wang & Li, 2017 – China
L. longyu Wang & Li, 2017 – China
L. lophacantha (Chen, Jia & Wang, 2010) – China
L. lujia Wang & Li, 2017 – China
L. martensi (Zhu & Li, 2021) – China
L. maxillacostata Lin & Li, 2010 – China
L. mayang Wang & Li, 2017 – China
L. megaloda (Chen, Jia & Wang, 2010) – China
L. meitan Lin & Li, 2010 – China
L. meiwang Wang & Li, 2017 – China
L. mengzongensis Wang & Li, 2011 – China
L. miaoshiensis (Chen & Zhang, 1993) – China
L. microdonta (Xu & Song, 1983) – China
L. mita Wang & Li, 2011 – China
L. nanmu Wang & Li, 2017 – China
L. niubizi Wang & Li, 2017 – China
L. notabilis (Lin & Li, 2010) – China
L. nuda (Chen, Jia & Wang, 2010) – China
L. oktocantha Lin & Li, 2010 – China
L. palmata Lin & Li, 2010 – China
L. panbao Wang & Li, 2017 – China
L. paragamiani Wang & Li, 2016 – Greece
L. parlonga Wang & Li, 2011 – China
L. penevi Wang & Li, 2016 – Greece
L. pentakis Lin & Li, 2010 – China
L. pungitia Wang & Li, 2011 – Vietnam
L. qiangdao Wang & Li, 2017 – China
L. quinquespinata (Chen & Zhu, 2008) – China
L. reticulopecta Lin & Li, 2010 – China
L. robustispina (Chen, Jia & Wang, 2010) – China
L. rudicula Wang & Li, 2011 – China
L. rudong Wang & Li, 2017 – China
L. sanchahe Wang & Li, 2017 – China
L. sanyan Wang & Li, 2017 – China
L. sexdentata Wang & Li, 2011 – China
L. sexdigiti (Lin & Li, 2010) – China
L. shanji Wang & Li, 2017 – China
L. shibingensis Guo, Yu & Chen, 2016 – China
L. shicheng Wang & Li, 2017 – China
L. shuang Wang & Li, 2017 – China
L. shuilian Wang & Li, 2017 – China
L. strinatii (Brignoli, 1976) – Greece
L. suae Lin & Li, 2010 – China
L. taixu (Zhu & Li, 2021) – China
L. tangi He, Liu, Xu, Yin & Peng, 2019 – China
L. tawo Wang & Li, 2017 – China
L. tetracantha Lin & Li, 2010 – China
L. thracia Gasparo, 2005 – Greece
L. tiankeng Wang & Li, 2017 – China
L. tianxinensis (Tong & Li, 2008) – China
L. tianxingensis Wang & Li, 2011 – China
L. tongzi Lin & Li, 2010 – China
L. trispinosa (Yin, Wang & Wang, 1984) – China
L. turcica (Danışman & Coşar, 2021) – Turkey
L. unispinosa (Yin, Wang & Wang, 1984) – China
L. wangjia Wang & Li, 2017 – China
L. wenzhu Wang & Li, 2017 – China
L. wuming Wang & Li, 2017 – China
L. xianren Wang & Li, 2017 – China
L. xianwu (Zhu & Li, 2021) – China
L. xiaoyan Wang & Li, 2017 – China
L. xinglong (Zhu & Li, 2021) – China
L. xinhua Wang & Li, 2017 – China
L. xui (Chen, Gao & Zhu, 2000) — China
L. yangi Lin & Li, 2010 – China
L. yaoi Wang & Li, 2011 – China
L. zakou Wang & Li, 2017 – China
L. zhai Wang & Li, 2011 – China

See also
 List of Leptonetidae species

References

Araneomorphae genera
Leptonetidae
Spiders of Asia